Micromitra is a genus of brachiopods known from the Middle Cambrian Burgess Shale. 160 specimens of Micromitra are known from the Greater Phyllopod bed, where they comprise 0.3% of the community.

References

External links 
 

Burgess Shale fossils
Prehistoric brachiopod genera
Paleontology in Washington (state)
Paleozoic life of Alberta
Paleozoic life of Newfoundland and Labrador
Paleozoic life of Nova Scotia

Cambrian genus extinctions